North Forsyth High School may refer one of the following public schools:
North Forsyth High School (North Carolina), in Winston-Salem, North Carolina
North Forsyth High School (Georgia), in Cumming, Georgia